Senator Candler may refer to:

Allen D. Candler (1834–1910), Georgia State Senate
Milton A. Candler (1837–1909), Georgia State Senate

See also
Senator Chandler (disambiguation)